Crobylophanes is a genus of moths in the family Tineidae. It contains only one species, Crobylophanes sericophaea, which is found in Democratic Republic of Congo.

References

External links
Natural History Museum Lepidoptera genus database

Tineidae
Monotypic moth genera
Endemic fauna of the Democratic Republic of the Congo